Sofie Hesselholdt (born 21 April 1974) and Vibeke Mejlvang (born 24 August 1976) are a collaborative duo of visual artists who live and work in Copenhagen. They started collaborating in late 1999 and work with performance art and site-specific installations in public spaces addressing social and political topics such as National Identity and Eurocentrism.

Early life and education 
Sofie Hesselholdt was born in 1974 in Copenhagen, Denmark. In 1998 she received a BA in Art History from the University of Copenhagen. In 1999 she started studying Fine Arts in the sculpture department under Lars Bent Petersen at the Funen Art Academy and in 2000 she got accepted at The Royal Danish Academy of Fine Arts in Copenhagen. There, she started a six years long degree with professors Yvette Brackman, Ann Lislegaard and the last year Henrik B. Andersen, who was her MA thesis supervisor.

Vibeke Mejlvang was born in 1976 in Hjørring, Denmark. Like Sofie Hesselholdt, she started studying in the sculpture departmentat the Funen Art Academy under Lars Bent Petersen, and in 2001 she started at the Royal Danish Academy of Fine Arts. During her five years of study, she had Lone Høyer Hansen, Yvette Brackman and Henrik B. Andersen as professors, and Henrik B. Andersen as MA thesis supervisor.

The two artists met during their studies in 1999 at the Funen Art Academy in Odense and began working together the same year with their first show "Go Construct" at DFKU, the Funen Art Academy's exhibition venue. They collaborated on many projects during their study years and graduated together.

Work and themes 
Since the beginning of their collaborative practice, Hesselholdt & Mejlvang have worked in a variety of media to create their distinctive expressions, using both classical expression such as sculpture, ceramics, photography, installation, and more contemporary approaches with large scenographic arrangements and performance art.

After their first show during their study, the duo worked with produced and found objects placed together in subtle arrangements (Krydstogt på Syndfloden Press Release), stuffed animals - often camouflaged - and taking up political and societal topics such as consumerism and immigration. During this period, they created their first wooden fence piece, which, together with the stuffed animals and flags, would later become one of their recognisable modes of expression.

The Black Flag 
In 2008, they began working with flags, more precisely a black flag. The latter, combined with a black fence and a hidden rose garden, formed the installation "Barrikade" which was awarded a prize by the Danish Arts Foundation. Further exhibitions have included, once again, stuffed animals and found objects such as fences/barriers, both indoor and outdoor types. Mørkemænd / Dark Men, a project for the biennial Socle du Monde in Herning, brought a lot of attention to their practice and would later be acquired by the Kunsten Museum of Modern Art.

Political aesthetic 
With The Perfect Storm in 2009, they unleashed a big exhibition featuring a whole new body of works, comprising ceramic, burned (black) flags, stuffed painted camouflage birds, crocodiles and other animals, and miniature recreations of spaces. A broken dystopian environment where Hesselholdt & Mejlvang reflected on political, cultural, and societal issues. The same year, they exhibited in Germany, Sweden and Denmark. In the next years they keep working with fences, and in 2010 they took part in the exhibition Party and Lost at Den Frie Udstilling. Party and Lost was a group of groups formed in 2009 by four artist groups: Randi & Katrine, Hesselholdt & Mejlvang, Bank & Rau, and the remains of Ingen Frygt. The group of groups set out to explore the nature of community as a source of both power and loss of self.

During the years 2011–2013, they began working with the colours red and white in their installations, later adding black. Flags, fences and animals were still a signature in their practice, now joined by carpets, 1:1 recreations of spaces and more ceramic handmade objects. Nationalism, racism and symbolism were at the core of their message and practice.

Shades of skin 
From 2014 to 2019, they addressed western values, ethnicity, looks, religion, and socio-political commitments of modern life, working with flags, drapes and stuffed animals. Pomp and Ceremony - Shades of Skin (the name of their first solo exhibition in Finland) was the core of their production of works.

Performance 
From 2017 onwards, performance has become an integral part of their practice. With embroidery and collaborative artworks, they created big installations and performances in Palermo during Manifesta 12, and in Thorvaldsens Museum in Copenhagen. The scale of their work has increased, bringing into play big embroidery works, balloon installations, big ceramic objects and public performances.  
 
In the later years they make also use of different media, spacing from newspapers to the digital world engaging more actively in debates and discussions, addressing topics such as language, ethnicity, religion, cultural expression and political structures.

Projects and exhibitions (selected)

Solo exhibitions 
2021
 "The White Exhibition", EMMA – Espoo Museum of Modern Art, Espoo, Finland
2020

 "Flag of Interests", Nuuk Art Museum, Nuuk, Greenland
"Native, Exotic, Normal / Circle of Flags", Horsens Kunstmuseum, Horsens, Denmark
"Soft power – a silent battle for hearts and minds", Politikens Forhal, Copenhagen, Denmark
2019
THIS MOMENT is the BEGINNING, Thorvaldsens Museum, Copenhagen, Denmark
2018
"Eternal Flame", V1 Gallery / Eighteen, Copenhagen, Denmark
"Points of Unity", IZOLYATSIA, Kyiv, Lviv and Kryvya Rih, Ukraine
2017
"Native, Exotic, Normal", Uppsala Konstmuseum, Uppsala, Sweden
2016
"Native, Exotic, Normal", Den Frie Centre for Contemporary Art, Copenhagen, Denmark
2015
"The Situation Room", FB69 Galerie Kolja Steinrötter, Münster, Germany
"Flesh Tint Project", KUNSTEN Museum of Modern Art + Kunsthal NORD, Aalborg, Denmark
"Homeland Security", Platform Arts, Belfast, Northern Ireland
2014
"Flags of Aggression", National Museum of Modern and Contemporary Art, Residency Changdong, Seoul, Korea
Little Blonde Girl, Charlotte Fogh Gallery, Aarhus, Denmark
"Pomp and Ceremony - Shades of Skin", Turku Art Museum, Turku, Finland
"Hunger for Aggression", Oslo Kunstforening, Oslo, Norway
"Armed Response", Norrtälje Konsthall, Norrtälje, Sweden
2013
"New Waves in the Hood", Das Kunstbüro, Aarhus, Denmark
"Hunger for Aggression", V1 Gallery, Copenhagen, Denmark
2012
"The Dark Passenger", SKMU Sørlandets Kunstmuseum, Kristiansand, Norway
2011
"Mörkersyn", Växjö Konsthall, Växjö, Sweden
2009
"Daily Life in the Eye of the Hurricane", FB69 Galerie Kolja Steinrötter, Münster, Germany
"The Perfect Storm", V1 Gallery, Copenhagen. Denmark
"Tornado Nearby", Charlotte Fogh Gallery at Preview Berlin, Germany
"Større Horisonter i Nabolaget", Charlotte Fogh Gallery, Aarhus, Denmark
"Udflugt i Bælgravende Mørke", Galleri 21, Malmo, Sweden
2007
"Krydstogt på Syndfloden", Fung Sway, Copenhagen, Denmark
2006
"When the Wind Blows", Charlotte Fogh Gallery, Aarhus, Denmark
2001
"Det er 27 grader i skyggen og Trust me, I wasn’t expecting our kiss, the Apistemple (With Nanna Debois Buhl) in Frederiksberg Garden, Copenhagen. Denmark
2000
"Indblik: Lykken kan læres", bunker in The Ørsteds Park, Copenhagen, Denmark

Group exhibitions 
2021
"This Boat with a Broken Rim", Mumbai Art Room, Mumbai, India
"Sustainable Societies for the Future", Malmö Art Museum, Malmö, Sweden
2020
"In Focus: Statements", Copenhagen Contemporary, Copenhagen, Denmark
"Up Close - Performance Festival", Det Classenske Bibliotek, Copenhagen, Denmark
"Udvekslinger", The Art Museum Brundlund Castle, Aabenraa, Denmark
2019
"FLAG - Objekt, Ikon, Symbol", Randers Art Museum, Randers, Denmark
"No Scrubs", Hot Dock Project Space, Bratislava, Slovakia
"Earth-Body", The Geological Museum of Mexico City, Mexico
"Mini Mono Mental", ChaShaMa, New York City, USA
"KNOWING ME KNOWING YOU", Künstlerhaus Bregenz, Austria
2018
"Manifesta 12", Palermo, Italy
2017
"Cool, Calm and Collected", ARoS Aarhus Art Museum, Aarhus, Denmark
"Revisit: Erotik", Overgaden Institute of Contemporary Art, Denmark
"Grand Designs - Clever Hands", CLAY keramikmuseum Danmark, Middelfart, Denmark
"Socle du Monde Biennial", HEART Museum of Contemporary Art, Herning, Denmark
"Carte Blanche", The French Embassy, Copenhagen, Denmark
"The Emperor is Naked", The Waiting Room, Minneapolis, MN, USA
2016
"The Emperor Has No Clothes", The Ski Club, Milwaukee, WI, USA
"En Blank og Vårfrisk Dag", Arbejdermuseet, Copenhagen, Denmark
2015
"World Script Symposia", Public space, Seoul, Korea
"NOT AT HOME", Viborg Kunsthal, Denmark
"Art Eco: Art-ivism", Museumcultuur Strombeek, Belgium
2014
"Other Forms of Relations", National Museum of Modern and Contemporary Art, Residency Changdong, Seoul, Korea
"Silent Review", National Museum of Modern and Contemporary Art, Residency Changdong, Seoul, Korea
"Drømmeland", KUNSTEN Museum of Modern Art Aalborg, Denmark
2013
"Common Tales", Skånes Konstförening, Malmo, Sweden
"1986 - 2013 / An artist collects art", Vestfossen Kunstlaboratorium, Øvre Eiker, Norway
2012
"Unfinished Journeys", Copenhagen Art Festival, Gl. Strand, Copenhagen, Denmark
"I’m like a bird", Johannes Larsen Museum, Kerteminde, Denmark
"Huset i Skoven", Skovhuset ved Søndersø, Værløse, Denmark
2011
"ENTER", Kunsthallen Brandts, Odense, Denmark
"I’m like a bird", Skovgaard Museum, Viborg, Denmark
"WHAT’S HE BUILDING IN THERE?", FUSE Gallery, NYC, USA
2010
"Socle du Monde", HEART - Herning Museum of Contemporary Art, Herning, Denmark
"Party and Lost", Den Frie Centre of Contemporary Art, Copenhagen, Denmark
"Nordic Art Triennial", Eskilstuna Art Museum, Eskilstuna, Sweden
2009
"Brede Værk" - Museum for Industrial culture, Danish National Museum, Brede, Denmark (permanent exhibition)
2008
"The Destruction of Atlantis", Union Gallery, London, United Kingdom
"Socle du Monde", HEART - Herning Museum of Modern Art, Denmark
"Pastiche", Sølyst Castle, Jyderup, Denmark
"Botanisk forvandling", Vejle Artmuseum, Denmark
"Kritisk form", Skulpturi.dk, Copenhagen, Denmark
2007
"Match Race", Kunsten – Museum of Modern Art Aalborg, Denmark
"WHEN HUMOUR BECOMES CRITICAL", Big Family Business, Istanbul, Turkey
"SPEAK UP", Den Frie Centre of Contemporary Art, Copenhagen, Denmark
"Homecoming", Vendsyssel Museum of Art, Hjørring, Denmark
2006
"Corner 2006", Kunsthal Charlottenborg, Copenhagen 
"EXIT06", Graduate Show, The Royal Danish Academy of Fine Arts, Kunstforeningen Gl. Strand, Copenhagen, Denmark
"Arbejde Arbejde Arbejde", Overgaden – Institute of Contemporary Art, Copenhagen, Denmark
"Add X to (n)", Museum of Contemporary Art, Roskilde, Denmark
2003
"Bagværk med glasur – keramik i Vejen", Vejen Art Museum, Denmark
"Overblik – historier om kunsten og den nye by", Museum of Contemporary Art, Roskilde / public space of Trekroner, Denmark
"THE PROJECT", Tallinn Arthall, Estonia / The Academy of Latvia’s Exhibition Hall, Latvia
"Det Hvide Guld", Royal Copenhagen / Marienlyst Castle, Elsinore, Denmark

Performances 
2020

 "Please rest in peace for we shall not repeat the error", Malmö Art Museum, Malmö, Sweden
 "Soft power - a silent battle for hearts and minds", Politikens Forhal, Copenhagen, Denmark
 "LESS POWER LESS", Copenhagen Contemporary, Copenhagen, Denmark
 "An Explosive Moment", Up Close Performance Festival, Copenhagen, Denmark

2019

 "Flag of Truce", Thorvaldsens Museum, Copenhagen, Denmark
 "THIS MOMENT is the BEGINNING", Thorvaldsens Museum, Copenhagen, Denmark

2018

 "For a Better Tomorrow", Manifesta 12, Palermo, Italy
 "Eternal Flame", V1 Gallery / Eighteen, Copenhagen, Denmark

2017

 "Desire for Domination", Overgaden. Institut for Samtidskunst, Copenhagen, Denmark

Commissions 
 The Danish Cultural Institute, New Delhi, India 2019
Falkonergården Gymnasium, Copenhagen, Denmark 2019
Public playground in Hillerød, Denmark 2018
The Tattooed Urn, Skovsnogen (Deep Forest Art Land), Herning, Denmark 2017
Common Images, Kvindehjemmet, Copenhagen, Denmark 2017
Totem, Herning Main Library, Herning, Denmark 2014
Flying Carpet, Ventemøllegården, Soroe, Denmark 2014
Hav, Hansted Monastery, Horsens, Denmark 2007
Torvet i Østerhøj, Ballerup, Denmark 2006
Højager School, Ballerup, Denmark 2005

Collections (selected) 
 National Gallery of Denmark, Copenhagen, Denmark
Malmö Art Museum, Malmö, Sweden
Uppsala Konstmuseum, Uppsala, Sweden
Sørlandets Kunstmuseum - SKMU, Kristiansand, Norway
Designmuseum Danmark, Copenhagen, Denmark
CLAY keramikmuseum Danmark, Middelfart, Denmark
KUNSTEN Museum of Modern Art Aalborg, Aalborg, Denmark
The Workers Museum, Copenhagen, Denmark
Ny Carlsbergfondet, Copenhagen, Denmark
The Danish Arts Foundation, Copenhagen, Denmark
The Royal Danish Art Collection, Copenhagen, Denmark
Aalborg Municipality Aalborg Kommunes Kunstfond, Aalborg, Denmark
Norrtälje Municipality, Sweden
Copenhagen Municipality, Denmark
Aarhus Municipality, Denmark
DBC, Ballerup, Denmark
Saxo Collection, Copenhagen, Denmark
Brask Collection, Denmark
Djurhuus Collection, Copenhagen, Denmark

Books and catalogues 
 A Radically Better Tomorrow, (Copenhagen, Roulette Russe, 2019) 
This Moment is the Beginning, (Copenhagen, Trojan Horse Press / V1 Gallery, 2019) 
The Aryan Zebra, (Berlin, Revolver Publishing, 2016) 
Native, Exotic, Normal, (Copenhagen, Den Frie Udstilling, 2016) 
Uorden - Disorder, (Vejby, Hurricane Publishing, 2009) 
Krydstogt på SyndFloden, (Valby, Fung Sway, 2007)

References

External links 
 

Living people
Danish contemporary artists
Art duos
Royal Danish Academy of Fine Arts alumni
Year of birth missing (living people)